is a Japanese sailor. She and Sena Takano placed 20th in the 49erFX event at the 2016 Summer Olympics.

References

1986 births
Living people
Japanese female sailors (sport)
Olympic sailors of Japan
Sailors at the 2016 Summer Olympics – 49er FX